Dorothy Wilson may refer to:

 Dorothy Clarke Wilson (1904–2003), American author and playwright
 Dorothy Wilson (actress) (1909–1998), American film actress